|}

The John Meagher Memorial Chase is a Listed National Hunt steeplechase in Ireland which is open to horses aged five years or older. It is run at Thurles over a distance of about 2 miles and 6 furlongs (4,426 metres), and it is scheduled to take place each year in November.

The event was formerly a handicap, first run in 1996, and was called the Thurles Handicap Chase. It became a conditions race in 2004, and it was given Listed status in 2009 at which point the race was renamed the Thurles Chase.

It was renamed in 2011 in memory of John Meagher, a great supporter of Thurles, who had one of his biggest days there when Monanore, which he also bred, landed the prestigious Molony Cup when trained by his great friend Billy Harney.  A keen amateur rider in his younger days, Meagher was nicknamed ‘Bougoure’ after the legendary Australian jockey Garnet Bougoure, who was attached to the Vincent O'Brien and Paddy Prendergast yards in the late 1950s and early 1960s.

Since 2015 it has been sponsored by the Boomerang Horse & Country Store.

Records
Most successful jockey (4 wins):
 Ruby Walsh - See Just There (1998), Mossy Green (2005), Noble Prince (2013), Champagne Fever (2016) 
 Davy Russell-  Public Reaction (2006), War of Attrition (2008), Roi du Mee (2012), Alpha des Obeaux (2018) 

Most successful trainer (7 wins): 
 Willie Mullins–  See Just There (1998),	Mossy Green (2005), Sir Des Champs (2015), Champagne Fever (2016), Bachasson (2017), Footpad (2019), Cilaos Emery (2021)

Winners

See also
 Horse racing in Ireland
 List of Irish National Hunt races

References

 Racing Post:

 independent.ie – "Compliance back in the groove" (2009)

National Hunt races in Ireland
National Hunt chases
Thurles Racecourse